Borovo may refer to:

Places

Bulgaria
 Borovo, Ruse Province, town in Ruse Province
 Borovo Municipality, Bulgaria, municipality in Ruse Province
 Borovo, Blagoevgrad Province, village in Blagoevgrad Province
 Borovo, Plovdiv Province, village in Plovdiv Province
 Borovo, Stara Zagora Province, village in Stara Zagora Province
 Borovo, Sofia, neighbourhood in the Krasno selo

Other
 Borovo, Croatia, village and municipality in Vukovar-Syrmia County, Croatia
 Borovo Naselje, part of Vukovar, Croatia
 Borovo, Kriva Palanka, village in Kriva Palanka Municipality, North Macedonia
 Borovo (Kraljevo), village in Kraljevo Municipality, Serbia

Other
 Borovo (company), Croatian leather and rubber products company